Alloeotomus is a genus of plant bugs belonging to the family Miridae.

The genus was described in 1858 by Franz Xaver Fieber.

The species of this genus are found in Eurasia.

Species:
 Alloeotomus germanicus
 Alloeotomus gothicus

References

Miridae